Texas to Bataan is a 1942 American Western film directed by Robert Emmett Tansey. The film is the seventeenth in Monogram Pictures' "Range Busters" series, and it stars John "Dusty" King as Dusty,  "Davy" Sharpe and Max "Alibi" Terhune, with Marjorie Manners, Steve Clark and Budd Buster.

This is the first in the series with "Davy" Sharpe taking the place of Ray "Crash" Corrigan as one of the leads.

The film is also known as The Long, Long Trail in the United Kingdom.

Premise 
Prior to the attack on Pearl Harbor, the U.S. Army buys some horses from the Range Busters' ranch for service in the Philippines.  The cowboys tangle with Axis spies in both Texas and in the Philippines.

Cast 
John 'Dusty' King as Dusty King
David Sharpe as Davy Sharpe
Max Terhune as Alibi Terhune
Elmer as Elmer Sneezeweed - Alibi's dummy
Marjorie Manners as Dallas Conroy
Steve Clark as Tom Conroy
Budd Buster as Tad Kelton
E. Baucin as Cookie (the spy)
Frank Ellis as Ken Richards (crooked rancher)
Kenne Duncan as Army Captain Anders
Guy Kingsford as Miller
Carl Mathews as Truck henchman
Tex Palmer as Truck henchman
Tom Steele as Truck henchman
Al Ferguson as Cafe henchman

Soundtrack 
John "Dusty" King - "Me and My Pony" (Written by John "Dusty" King)
John "Dusty" King - "Goodbye Old Paint" (Traditional)
John "Dusty" King - "Home on the Range"

Further reading
 , esp. pp  25, 33, 35,  46-47.

See also
The Range Busters series:
 The Range Busters (1940)
 Trailing Double Trouble (1940)
 West of Pinto Basin (1940)
 Trail of the Silver Spurs (1941)
 The Kid's Last Ride (1941)
 Tumbledown Ranch in Arizona (1941)
 Wrangler's Roost (1941)
 Fugitive Valley (1941)
 Saddle Mountain Roundup (1941)
 Tonto Basin Outlaws (1941)
 Underground Rustlers (1941)
 Thunder River Feud (1942)
 Rock River Renegades (1942)
 Boot Hill Bandits (1942)
 Texas Trouble Shooters (1942)
 Arizona Stage Coach (1942)
 Texas to Bataan (1942)
 Trail Riders (1942)
 Two Fisted Justice (1943)
 Haunted Ranch (1943)
 Land of Hunted Men (1943)
 Cowboy Commandos (1943)
 Black Market Rustlers (1943)
 Bullets and Saddles (1943)

External links 

1942 films
1940s English-language films
American black-and-white films
1942 Western (genre) films
1940s war films
Monogram Pictures films
American Western (genre) films
Films set in the Philippines
World War II films made in wartime
Films directed by Robert Emmett Tansey
Range Busters